The Church of St. Ignatius of Loyola is a Catholic parish church located on the Upper East Side of Manhattan, New York City, administered by the Society of Jesus (Jesuits). The parish is under the authority of the Archdiocese of New York, and was established in 1851 as St. Lawrence O'Toole's Church. In 1898, permission to change the patron saint of the parish from St. Lawrence O'Toole to St. Ignatius of Loyola was granted by Rome. The address is 980 Park Avenue, New York City, New York 10028. The church on the southwest corner of Park Avenue and 84th Street is part of a Jesuit complex on the block that includes Wallace Hall, the parish hall beneath the church, the rectory at the midblock location on Park Avenue, the grade school of St. Ignatius's School on the north midblock location of 84th Street behind the church and the high school of Loyola School (also 980 Park Avenue) at the northwest corner of Park Avenue and 83rd Street. In addition, another Jesuit high school, Regis High School (55 E 84th Street), occupies the midblock location on the north side of 84th Street.  The church was added to the National Register of Historic Places on July 24, 1980.

History 
The parish was established in 1851. Occupying "the site of the former St. Lawrence O'Toole Church, founded in 1851, and named for a twelfth-century bishop of Dublin by the parish's first pastor, the Rev. Eugene O'Reilly from Ireland.<ref name="stignatiusloyola.org">[http://www.stignatiusloyola.org/index.php/about_us/church_history_tour  "St. Ignatius Loyola, A Pictorial History and Walking Guide of New York City’s Church of St. Ignatius Loyola. 1999, cited on church website.]</ref>   The parish was entrusted to the care of the Society of Jesus in 1886 and marked the Jesuits' first major apostolate in the Yorkville area of New York. Late-nineteenth-century directories listed the address of St. Lawrence at the corner of Park Avenue and East 84th Street.

The present grand limestone edifice stands as testimony to both the growing affluence and confidence of the Catholic community on New York's Upper East Side near the start of the 20th century as well as the ambitious determination of Fr. Neil McKinnon, S.J., pastor of the parish from 1893 to 1907. During his time, Martin J. Scott, later a noted author of novels and controversial literature, worked as assistant priest among the young (1902-1915) and built a day nursery in 1910.

The church was declared a New York City Landmark on March 4, 1969. The church was added to the National Register of Historic Places on July 24, 1980.

 Notable funerals 
 Jacqueline Kennedy Onassis, First Lady – May 1994
 Aaliyah, singer and actress – August 2001
 Patricia Kennedy Lawford – September 2006
 Lena Horne, singer and actress – May 2010
 Philip Seymour Hoffman, actor – February 2014
 Oscar de la Renta, fashion designer – November 2014
 Mario Cuomo, governor of New York – January 2015
  Ann Mara, co-owner of N.Y. Giants Football Team – February 2015
  David Carr, N.Y. Times media columnist – February 2015

 Architecture 

Construction
A wooden church was erected in 1852, which was replaced in 1853 by a modest brick structure.

The church's present foundation was built 1884-1886 as the foundations to a planned Gothic design. The parish was transferred to Jesuit control in 1886. The present church was built 1895 to 1900 to the designs of architect J. William Schickel of Schickel & Ditmars, and dedicated on December 11, 1898, by the Most Reverend Michael Corrigan, third Archbishop of New York.Christopher Gray,  "STREETSCAPES: Seven Apartment Houses in a Piazza-like Setting." New York Times. March 9, 2008.

ExteriorSt. Ignatius Loyola, A Pictorial History and Walking Guide of New York City's Church of St. Ignatius Loyola (1999) includes an exemplary description of the exterior and interior of the church:

Two unbroken vertical orders, a Palladian arched window, and a tri-part horizontal division suggesting the central nave and side aisles beyond, lend a Classical balance to the Park Avenue exterior.  Yet St. Ignatius' façade is not static; the central division raised in slight relief beyond the side divisions and the varying intervals between the symmetrically positioned pilasters (columns that are not free standing) create a subtly undulating dynamism that introduces a note of syncopated rhythm reminiscent of the exterior of Il Gesù, the Jesuits' mother church in Rome.  The original plans for the street front of St. Ignatius, presently 90 feet high and 87 feel wide, included a pair of towers designed to reach 210 feet above the ground, but this feature of the project was abandoned early, leaving only the two copper-capped tower bases on either side of the central pediment as hints of the grander scheme.  Located directly beneath this pediment are the motto of the Society of Jesus, Ad Majorem Dei Gloriam (To the Greater Glory of God) and the Great Seal of the Society, composed of a cross, three nails, and the letters I H S (the first three letters of Jesus' name in Greek which later became a Latin acronym denoting Jesus the Savior of Humankind); together they proclaim to all who pass by that St. Ignatius is a Jesuit Parish.

Interior

The church is constructed of American, European, and African marbles, including pink Tennessee, red-veined Numidian, yellow Siena, pink Algerian marble, white Carrara marble, and veined Pavonazzo marble; most of the intricate marble work was executed by the firm of James G. Batterson Jr., and John Eisele of New York.

The marble mosaic Stations of the Cross panels were designed by Professor Paoletti for Salviati & Company of Venice; some were publicly exhibited in Turin before installation.

The great twelve-panel bronze doors located at the sanctuary end of the side aisles… were designed by the Rev. Patrick O'Gorman, S.J., pastor from 1924 to 1929... [and were] crafted by the Long Island Bronze Company….

The Jesuit statues, including St. Francis Xavier and St. John Francis Regis were carved by the Joseph Sibbel Studio of New York in Carrara marble.

The church is notable for its organ, dedicated in 1993 and built by N.P. Mander of London, "this instrument is New York City's largest mechanical action (tracker) pipe organ, and the largest mechanical action pipe organ ever to have been built in the British Isles."

Baptistery The semi-circular wrought-iron baptistery screen in the Chapel of John the Baptist of gilt flaming swords was wrought by Mr. John Williams to the designs of William Schickel. The baptistery font is of Carrara marble set above marble pavement designed "by Heaton, Butler & Bayne of London, with slight modifications made by Mr. John Buck of the Ecclesiastical Department of the Gorham Company of New York; the Gorham Company was also responsible for cutting and installing the mosaic's tesserae (the pieces comprising the mosaic)."  The baptistery's altar and surround curved walls are of Pavonazzo marble inlaid with mosaics, "designed and executed under the direction of Mr. Caryl Coleman of the Ecclesiastical Department of the Tiffany Glass and Decorating Company. These mosaics, composed of that company's justly famous opalescent Favrile glass, are as delicate as the Venetian glass mosaics above are bold." Tiffany also executed the baptistery's semi-dome.

List of rectors
1.  Rev. Eugene O'Reilly, rector 1851-August 5, 1852
2.  Rev. Thomas Ouellet, S.J., rector 1852- 
3. Rev. Walter J. Quarter, rector –1866
4. Rev. Samuel Mulledy (1811–1866), rector 1863–1866
5. Rev. Victor Beaudevin, S.J., rector 1866–
10. Rev. John Treanor, S.J., rector (–1880)
11. Rev. Robert J. Fulton, S.J.(1826-1895), rector November 1, 1880- 
12. Rev. David Merrick, S.J. (rector 1880–)

13. Rev. Neil McKinnon, S.J., rector July 31, 1893 – 1907 (parish rededicated on December 11, 1898, with new upper church dedicated to St. Ignatius Loyola and lower church dedicated to St. Lawrence O'Toole)
14. William O'Brien Pardow, S.J., rector 1907-1909
15. David Hearn, S.J., rector 1909-1915
16. Cowles Havens Richards, S.J., rector 1915-1919
17. James J. Kilrowy, S.J., rector 1919-1924
18. Patrick F. O'Gorman, S.J., rector 1924-1929
19. Edward J. Sweeney, S.J., rector 1930-1933
20. William J. Devlin, S.J., rector 1933-1935
21. W. Coleman Nevils, S.J., rector 1935-1940
22. Francis A. McQuade, S.J., rector 1940-1945
23. John Edwards Gratton, S.J., rector 1945-1949
24. C. Justin Hanley, S.J., rector 1949-1952
25. Robert I. Gannon, S.J., rector 1952-1958
26. John J. McGinty, S.J., rector 1958-1960
27. William T. Wood, S.J., rector 1960-1966
28. Charles T. Taylor, S.J., rector 1966-1970
29. Robert J. Haskins, S.J., rector 1970-1979
30. Victor R. Yanitelli, S.J., rector 1980-1986
31. Walter F. Modrys, S.J., rector 1986-2005
32. Gerald R. Blaszczak, S.J., rector 2005-2008
33. William J. Bergen, S.J., acting rector June–August 2008
34. George M. Witt, S.J., rector 2008-2015
35. Thomas H. Feely, S.J., parish administrator 2015–2016
36. Dennis J. Yesalonia, S.J., rector 2016–Present

 See also 
 National Register of Historic Places listings in Manhattan below 14th Street
 List of Jesuit sites
 List of New York City Designated Landmarks in Manhattan below 14th Street

 References 
Notes

Further reading

Dunlap, David W. From Abyssinian to Zion: A Guide to Manhattan's Houses of Worship. (New York: Columbia University Press, 2004).
 St. Ignatius Loyola, A Pictorial History and Walking Guide of New York City's Church of St. Ignatius Loyola,'' 1999. Photos by Laurie Lambrech.

External links

Italianate architecture in New York City
Properties of religious function on the National Register of Historic Places in Manhattan
St. Ignatius of Loyola, Church of (New York City)
Roman Catholic churches completed in 1898
19th-century Roman Catholic church buildings in the United States
Italian-American culture in New York City
Roman Catholic churches in Manhattan
Jesuit churches in the United States
New York City Designated Landmarks in Manhattan
Park Avenue
Schickel & Ditmars church buildings
Baroque Revival architecture in New York City
Yorkville, Manhattan
1851 establishments in New York (state)
Churches on the National Register of Historic Places in New York (state)
Italianate church buildings in the United States
Neoclassical church buildings in the United States